Bingham High School is a public high school located in South Jordan, Utah, United States. It is one of eight high schools in the Jordan School District. Teacher/pupil ratios are budgeted at 1 to 27.3, with actual class sizes varying. The school's name and mascot are derived from its proximity to the Bingham Copper Mine.

History 
Established in 1908, Bingham is one of the oldest schools in the state of Utah. It was originally built in Copperton, Utah. In 1975, the high school was moved to a new building in South Jordan that is still being used today. The old school was converted into a junior high and operated until 2002 when it was closed and demolished. 

In 2013, over 2,000 Bingham students and faculty participated in a yearbook video that went viral on YouTube.

In 2014, the principal at the time was criticized for slut-shaming students, nearly two dozen of whom he barred from entry to a school dance for showing too much skin. 80 students ended up walking out of the event in protest.

In 2021, the school started a five-year $37.9 million renovation. Delays from the project forced students to temporarily participate virtually.

In 2022, a wrestling coach from the high school was charged with sexual abuse of a minor for assaulting a female student in an equipment room.

Student government
The Bingham High student government began in the 1910s.  The first student body president on record was Dewey Miller, who led the miner student body during the 1917–1918 school year. In the 1920s, student government at Bingham consisted of three branches: executive, legislative, and judicial. The student body officers formed the executive branch with a president, vice president, secretary-treasurer, yell master, yearbook editor and business manager. The principal, representatives from all the classes, and two faculty members made up the legislative branch. The student body court, with a prosecuting attorney, judge, chief of police and a clerk, handled the judicial duties of interpreting the school constitution and maintaining discipline.

School athletics
Bingham received the Deseret News All-Sports Award in 2009 and 2011 for having the highest finishes in boys' and girls' sports of any 5A school in the state of Utah. Bingham High School's athletics department includes the following sports:

Baseball - Since baseball came to Bingham in 1925, Miner teams have established a dynasty of state champions. Miner base ballers have taken the state title 22 times (1932, 1933, 1934, 1935, 1939, 1940, 1942, 1947, 1950, 1952, 1954, 1955, 1974, 1975, 1976, 1984, 1985, 1999, 2003, 2011, 2013 and 2018), more than any other school in Utah.
Basketball - Basketball began during the 1915-1916 school year with the completion of the school’s first gymnasium in November 1915. Basketball teams have since won ten state championships (in 1960, 1973, 1974, 1977, 1978, 1989, 1990, 2006, 2016, 2017) under coaches Udell Wankier, George Sluga, Mark Dubach, and Jake Schroeder.
Competitive cheerleading
Cross country - Bingham High Men’s Cross Country team won the National Championship in 1995, becoming the first team to win a national championship for Bingham and the first men’s high school team of any sport to win a national championship in the state of Utah. The Harriers also have four state championships to their credit (1990, 1995, 1996, and 2003). Lady Miners won state championships in cross country in 1998, 1999, and 2000. The girls’ cross Ccuntry team also won Bingham’s second national championship in 1999.
Football - Bingham Miners Football program have won 11 state championships in the years 1939, 1941, 1945, 1946, 2006, 2009, 2010, 2013, 2014, 2016, and 2017. It is a common trend for Bingham footballer players to go on to play at Brigham Young University, with Bleacher Report calling it the "Bingham to BYU pipeline".
Golf
Ice hockey
Marching band
Minerette drill team - Bingham Minerettes have won 10 State Championships: 2004, 2005, 2006, 2007, 2010, 2011, 2012, 2020, 2021, 2022.
Soccer
Softball
Swimming
Tennis
Track and field
Volleyball
Wrestling

Notable alumni
Jaime Bergman - model and actress
Francis Bernard - professional football player in the National Football League (NFL)
Dalton Schultz - professional football player in the National Football League (NFL)
Rebecca Chavez-Houck - member of the Utah House of Representatives since 2008 and current minority whip of the body
Kevin Curtis - professional football player in the National Football League (NFL)
Bruce Hardy - professional football player in the National Football League (NFL)
Harvey Langi - professional football player in the National Football League (NFL)
Star Lotulelei - professional football player in the National Football League (NFL)
Paul Peterson - former college football quarterback (Boston College Eagles) and current coach (head coach at Dixie State University)
Ivy Baker Priest - United States Treasurer under Dwight D. Eisenhower
Fred Roberts - professional basketball player in the National Basketball Association (NBA)
Elmer Ward - professional football player in the National Football League (NFL)
Gary Wilkinson - professional basketball player in the National Basketball Association (NBA)
Dax Milne - professional football player in the National Football League (NFL)

References

External links

Jordan School District website

Educational institutions established in 1908
Public high schools in Utah
Schools in Salt Lake County, Utah
1908 establishments in Utah
Buildings and structures in South Jordan, Utah